Quintus Caecilius Epirota (1st Century BC) was a freeman of Atticus, a grammarian, and the first person to initiate the public teaching of Virgil’s poetry.

Life
Atticus had employed Epirota to teach his daughter, but he became suspicious about the tutor’s attitude towards her, and dismissed him. Epirota then found a patron in Gaius Cornelius Gallus, and after the latter’s fall set up his own independent teaching school.

Works
Epirota is best known as the first person to discuss his contemporary, Virgil, in public and in Latin. As Suetonius Tranquillus records, he was “the first to hold extempore discussions in Latin, and the first to begin the practice of reading Vergil and other recent poets”.

See also
Abelard
Cornelius Epicadus
Parthenius of Nicaea
Verrius Flaccus

References

Further reading
S F Bonner, Education in Ancient Rome (Berkeley 1977)

External links
Epirota, Nurse of Baby Bards
Lives of Eminent Grammarians:16

Grammarians of Latin
1st-century BC educators
Latinists